Robert Barlow may refer to:
Robert Barlow (Royal Navy officer) (1757–1843), Royal Navy officer
Robert Barlow (cartographer) (1813–1883), Canadian cartographer
R. H. Barlow (1918–1951), American author
Bob Barlow (born 1935), Canadian ice-hockey player